Sandhills railway station is a railway station in Kirkdale, Liverpool,  England, located to the north of the city centre on the Northern Line of the Merseyrail network. It was built by the Liverpool, Crosby and Southport Railway Company and now stands at the junction between the branch to Southport and the branch to Ormskirk and Kirkby.

The two platforms form a single island, overlooking the River Mersey on one side, and the former industrial area of Commercial Road on the other. It is also used by football fans heading for Liverpool F.C. and Everton F.C. matches: a bus service called Soccerbus runs between the station and the football stadiums on match-days only.

Previously passengers had to walk up a ramp to reach the ticket office, then through a subway and up ramps to reach the platform.
Now the ramp remains, with alternate staircase. Leading to a lift directly into the Booking Office, accessing both sides of the island platforms.

History 
Sandhills opened in 1850 as an intermediate station when the Liverpool, Crosby and Southport Railway was extended from its previous terminal at Waterloo to Liverpool Exchange.  It became part of the Lancashire and Yorkshire Railway (LYR), on 14 June 1855. who took over from the (LCSR). The Lancashire and Yorkshire Railway amalgamated with the London and North Western Railway on 1 January 1922 and in turn was Grouped into the London, Midland and Scottish Railway in 1923.  Nationalisation followed in 1948 and in 1978 the station became part of the Merseyrail Network's Northern Line (operated by British Rail until privatised in 1995).  The station had four wooden platforms until it was rationalised between December 1973 and September 1974.

An extensive refurbishment plan for the station was suggested in 2006 which involved the building of a completely new booking hall and greatly improved facilities on the platform. A large canopy was constructed - originally intended to cover the entire length of the platform, but now eventually covering approximately half. In addition, a dedicated bus-rail interchange point was built, improving transport beyond the station to localities such as Kirkdale, Anfield and Everton. On 24 April 2007, improvement works to the station at a cost of £6 million were agreed. In November 2007, it was announced that the station would be closed from 17 November 2007 until March 2008 for refurbishment. The refurbishment work was extended until July 2008, when the station reopened in a partly completed state. The full completion of the work at the station was finished in early 2009.

Between March and December 2024, the station is due to have its capacity increased as part of the development of Liverpool Waters.

Facilities
The station is staffed 15 minutes before the first service and 15 minutes after the last service. There are toilets, platform CCTV and a booking office. There are departure and arrival screens on the platform for passenger information. Each of the two platforms has sheltered seating. The station does not have a car park, though there is a cycle rack with 10 spaces. The station is fully wheelchair accessible and access to the station is via lifts and ramps.

Services 
Off-peak service frequency is as follows:

 4 trains per hour (tph) to Southport
 4 tph to Ormskirk
 4 tph to Kirkby
 12 tph to Liverpool Central
 of which 4 tph continue to Hunts Cross

During late evenings and on Sundays, frequencies are reduced to 2 tph on the Ormskirk and Kirkby lines. On Sundays, frequencies are reduced to 2 tph beyond Liverpool Central to Hunts Cross; also on winter Sundays (late September until the mid-May timetable change) they run every 30 minutes on the Liverpool Central to Southport section, giving a total 6 tph from all lines between Sandhills and Liverpool Central.

Gallery

Land history 
In the early nineteenth century, the estate of Sandhills was purchased by Liverpool solicitor and land speculator, John Leigh (1752-1823). As well as building a 'handsome house, where he had beautiful gardens, complete with hothouses and conservatories'. He also turned much of the pasture land to clay pits and brickworks needed to fuel the rapid growth of Liverpool - he reputedly lowered the ground level by seven or eight feet (well over two metres). His son, John Shaw Leigh (1791-1871) reaped the most benefit, selling plots piecemeal at huge profits to supply the land needed for the expanding docks and railways.

References

External links 

Railway stations in Liverpool
DfT Category E stations
Former Lancashire and Yorkshire Railway stations
Railway stations in Great Britain opened in 1850
Railway stations served by Merseyrail